ADS 7251 is a binary star system  from the Sun.

ADS 7251 A is 0.06 magnitudes (six percent) brighter than ADS 7251 B.  A catalogue of MK spectral classes lists both stars as secondary standards, with ADS 7251 A being class M0V and ADS 7251 B being class K7V, noted as being unusual in the brighter star having a later spectral type.  Other publications have described the stars as being both K7V, both M0V, or the primary being K7V and the secondary M0V.

Planetary system 

ADS 7251 B also known as Gliese 338B or HD 79211, is orbited by one known super-Earth planet detected by radial velocity.

Notes

References

Ursa Major (constellation)
Binary stars
M-type main-sequence stars
0338
Planetary systems with one confirmed planet
Multi-star planetary systems
079210/1
45343/120005
Durchmusterung objects